Celloxylanase is the name of enzyme which degrade the glycans and the xylans.

References

Enzymes